Andrey Krylov (born November 14, 1988) is a Russian trampoline gymnast and was the gold medallist in men's tumbling at the 2007 Trampoline World Championships. Andrey Krylov tested positive for stimulants at the Trampoline World Cup stage in Loulé (POR), September 2012. Krylov received a twelve-month suspension, effective from October 1, 2012 through and including September 30, 2013.

References

External links
 
 

1988 births
Living people
Doping cases in gymnastics
Russian male trampolinists
Russian sportspeople in doping cases
Medalists at the Trampoline Gymnastics World Championships
Competitors at the 2009 World Games
World Games gold medalists
21st-century Russian people